Henguiyeh (also Romanized as Hengū’īyeh; also known as Hankū’īyeh, Honkū’īyeh, Hamgū’īyeh, Hamkoo’eyeh, Hamkū’īyeh, and Hatgū’īyeh) is a village in Jorjafak Rural District, in the Central District of Zarand County, Kerman Province, Iran. At the 2006 census, its population was 22, in 8 families.

References 

Populated places in Zarand County